The Letelier-Moffitt Human Rights Award is awarded annually by the Washington, D.C.-based Institute for Policy Studies (IPS). It is awarded to those advancing the cause of human rights in the Americas. The Letelier-Moffitt Human Rights Award commemorates Orlando Letelier and Ronni Moffitt, who in 1976 were assassinated in Washington, D.C. by agents of the Chilean secret service. It was first presented in 1978.

Award recipients

References

Awards established in 1978
American awards
Humanitarian and service awards
Human rights in Latin America
Human rights awards
1978 establishments in Washington, D.C.